How the Mighty Fall is the third solo studio album from Take That band member, Mark Owen. The album was released on 18 April 2005, nearly two years after his second album and produced by Tony Hoffer. The album sold 3,280 copies in the UK and missed the top 100, remaining his lowest selling album in his solo career. Three singles were released from the album: "Makin' Out", "Believe in the Boogie" and "Hail Mary". This was the last studio album released by Owen before the reunion of his band Take That.

Track listing

Personnel

Ben Mark - Acoustic Guitar, Guitar, Vocals (Backing Vocals)
Jamie Norton - Piano, Vocals (Backing Vocals)
David Campbell - Viola, Strings and Horns
Paul Freeman - Guitar, Vocals (Backing Vocals)
Mark Owen - Vocals (Backing Vocals)
Dan Rothchild - Bass
Rose Corrigan - Bassoon
Larry Corbett - Cello
Martin Jenkins - Recording
Roger J. Manning Jr. - Keyboards, Piano, Synth
Suzie Katayama - Cello, Contractor
James Self - Tuba
Leo Abraham - Piano
Adam Falkner - Drums, Percussion
Rachel Stegeman - Violin
Tony Hoffer - Producer, Mixer
Mark Christian - Guitar
Daniel Higgins - Clarinet
Joey Waronker - Drums, Percussion
Neil Heal - Engineer
Greg Kurstin - Piano
Todd Burke - Engineer
Sara Parkins - Violin
Chris Reynolds - Engineer (Assistant)
Bettie Ross-Blumer - Copyist
Jon Lewis - Trumpet
Dave Palmer - Keyboards, Synth (Additional)
Bill Reichenbach Jr. - Trombone
Jason Mott - Engineer (Assistant)
Brian "Big Bass" Gardner - Mastering

Chart performance

References

2005 albums
Mark Owen albums
Albums produced by Tony Hoffer